The murder of Chaim Weiss, a student in the yeshiva of Long Beach, New York, United States, took place on November 1, 1986. His murder remains unsolved, though investigators believe the murderer was a student or faculty member of the yeshiva. The Daily News called it "one of New York’s most baffling unsolved mysteries".

Murder and crime scene
Chaim Weiss was killed in his sleep by a hatchet-like weapon between the hours of 1:20 and 6:00 AM on Saturday, November 1, 1986. He was sleeping alone in his third-floor dorm room at 63 East Beech St. in Long Beach, New York. He was one of only two students in the yeshiva dormitory to have his own room. There was no back door to the room. 

Weiss was hit in the head so hard that his skull was crushed. He was struck twice in the head in what a detective described as "an extremely brutal murder". The murder weapon was never recovered. The body had been moved to the floor and the window was opened. Weiss was last seen alive at approximately 12:45 AM Saturday morning by a study partner. Weiss’ parents Anton and Pessy were living in Staten Island and only received word of his death towards the end of Shabbat, when notified by local police. 1,000 mourners attended Weiss' funeral service at the Shomrei Hadas Chapel in the Borough Park section of Brooklyn.

Peculiarities
There were multiple peculiarities that led police to believe that the murderer was knowledgable in Jewish rituals dealing with the dead. The window was found open even though the outside temperature was in the 40s. Weiss was taking antibiotics for a sore throat making it unlikely that he would have opened it. The body was found on the floor, clad in pajamas and with the feet propped on the bed. Police determined that the body was in the bed for several hours after the attack. The open window according to police may be a Jewish custom to allow the deceased's soul to depart, though the theory that the window may have been in an attempt to combat the smell of the body should enough time elapse between the murder & the discovery has not been extensively addressed.

A few months before the murder, while Chaim was spending the summer away from home, the principal of the Yeshiva school called Chaim's home twice, seeking to set up a meeting with Chaim. The parents said Chaim didn’t want to talk about what was discussed in his private meeting with the principal at a Brooklyn home.

Investigation
Yeshiva officials refused to discuss the case extensively until after Shabbat. Investigators looked into a janitor and a mentally ill man and also considered the possibility that the murder was committed by a Halloween thrill-seeker. The suspects and the thrill-seeker theory were since ruled out. School administrators told the media that they had no previous issues with anti-semitism. 25 detectives worked on the case full time for months. A police mobile command center was situated outside the yeshiva for a week open for anyone to share information. A single strand of hair not belonging to Weiss was found near his body. The police are waiting for a suspect before running a DNA test on the sample, for fear of ruining it. An FBI profile suggested the killer was someone Weiss knew and around his age. There was no sign of forced entry or sexual assault and no students reported hearing sounds of a struggle.

Weiss’ father Anton was disappointed with the Nassau police’s handling of the case and requested the naming of a special prosecutor though that never happened.

Reopening of case
In May 2013 Nassau police reopened the case and increased the reward to $25,000 for information leading to an arrest. Weiss' father Anton appeared at the press conference alongside police urging former students to come forward with any information.

After a PIX 11 interview with Weiss' father in 2017, the outlet reported that a former student came forward alleging physical abuse at the yeshiva a decade before the murder. They also reported on a suicide by hanging in the yeshiva dorm shower several years before the murder.

Media
Weiss' murder was the subject of episode 4.30 of Unsolved Mysteries and was featured on the true crime podcast Killer Instincts.

See also
 List of unsolved murders

External links
 Chaim Weiss - Unsolved Mysteries
 Crimestoppers

References

1986 in Judaism
1986 in New York (state)
1986 murders in the United States
Axe murder
November 1986 events in the United States
November 1986 crimes
People murdered in New York (state)
Long Beach, New York
Murdered American Jews
Murdered American children
Incidents of violence against boys
Murdered American students
School killings in the United States
Unsolved murders in the United States